Indira Ilić (born 17 November 1986) is a Serbian association football defender, currently playing for Swedish club Assi IF. She previously played for Mašinac Niš, Crvena Zvezda, and Emerald City FC.

Early life
Ilić attended college at Iowa Western Community College in Council Bluffs. She was the captain and second leading scorer on the team with 18 goals and 13 assists. She won several awards including Defensive Most Valuable Player, the Vanguard Award, and was named to the All-region XI First Team, NJCAA All-American First Team and NJCAA National All-Tournament Team.

Playing career

International
Ilić is a member of the Serbian national team.

References

External links
 
 Iowa Western Community College player profile

1986 births
Living people
Serbian women's footballers
Serbia women's international footballers
Iowa Western Reivers women's soccer players
Women's association football defenders
ŽFK Mašinac PZP Niš players
ŽFK Crvena zvezda players
Serbian expatriate women's footballers
Serbian expatriate sportspeople in the United States
Expatriate women's soccer players in the United States
Serbian expatriate sportspeople in Sweden
Expatriate women's footballers in Sweden